Ottleya is a genus of flowering plants in the family Fabaceae (legumes). It is native to the southwestern United States (Arizona, California, Colorado, Nevada, New Mexico, Texas and Utah) and to Mexico.

Taxonomy
Ottleya belongs to a group of species traditionally placed in the tribe Loteae of the subfamily Faboideae. The taxonomy of this group is complex, and its division into genera has varied considerably. Many species of Ottleya were formerly placed in a broadly defined genus Lotus. A molecular phylogenetic study in 2000 based on nuclear ribosomal ITS sequences confirmed the view that the "New World" (American) and "Old World" (African and Eurasian) species of Lotus did not belong in the same genus. Ottleya was monophyletic.

Species
, Plants of the World Online accepted the following species:

Ottleya flexuosa (Greene) D.D.Sokoloff
Ottleya intricata (Eastw.) D.D.Sokoloff
Ottleya mollis (A.Heller) D.D.Sokoloff & Gandhi
Ottleya nivea (S.Watson) D.D.Sokoloff
Ottleya oroboides (Kunth) D.D.Sokoloff
Ottleya plebeia (Brandegee) D.D.Sokoloff
Ottleya rigida (Benth.) D.D.Sokoloff
Ottleya strigosa (Nutt.) D.D.Sokoloff
Ottleya utahensis (Ottley) D.D.Sokoloff
Ottleya wrightii (A.Gray) D.D.Sokoloff

References

Loteae
Flora of Arizona
Flora of California
Flora of Colorado
Flora of Nevada
Flora of New Mexico
Flora of Texas
Flora of Utah
Flora of Mexico
Fabaceae genera